The fourth and final season of the ABC American television drama series Revenge premiered on September 28, 2014. This season saw several cast changes as both Barry Sloane and Henry Czerny's characters, Aiden Mathis and Conrad Grayson, were killed off in the Season 3 finale. This was the first season not to feature Czerny's character. James Tupper and Karine Vanasse, who played David Clarke and Margaux LeMarchal respectively, were upgraded to series regulars. The series stars Madeleine Stowe and Emily VanCamp as Victoria Grayson and Emily Thorne, respectively.

The principal cast were joined by two new series regulars: Brian Hallisay as Ben Hunter, an aspiring police detective and partner of Jack Porter, and Elena Satine as Louise Ellis, a wealthy heiress and patient at the local psychiatric hospital.

The season focuses on the revelation that David Clarke is alive and the continued feud between Emily and Victoria, who is now aware of Emily's true identity and is seeking her own revenge.

On April 29, 2015, ABC canceled Revenge after four seasons.

Plot
Season four of Revenge opens six months after the events of the season three finale. Emily is living in Grayson Manor, Victoria is committed to a mental hospital desperately trying to escape, and David Clarke is alive. For the past three years, Emily has worked to take down all of the people who played a part in framing her father. She has finally taken down the Graysons only to discover that her father is alive. The problem is that Victoria gets to him first and takes her own revenge by feeding him lies about Emily and leaving him in the dark that she is actually his daughter. Emily's revenge is not over. She soon discovers that the man who kept her father kidnapped for most of her life is also still alive.

Cast and characters

Main cast
 Madeleine Stowe as Victoria Grayson 
 Emily VanCamp as Emily Thorne / Amanda Clarke
 Gabriel Mann as Nolan Ross 
 Nick Wechsler as Jack Porter 
 Josh Bowman as Daniel Grayson
 Christa B. Allen as Charlotte Clarke
 James Tupper as David Clarke 
 Karine Vanasse as Margaux LeMarchal 
 Brian Hallisay as Ben Hunter
 Elena Satine as Louise Ellis-Ross

Recurring cast
 Ed Quinn as James Allen
 Carolyn Hennesy as Penelope Ellis
 Nestor Serrano as Edward Alvarez
 Gail O'Grady as Stevie Grayson
 Courtney Ford as Kate Taylor
 Josh Pence as Tony Hughes
 Sebastian Pigott as Lyman Ellis
 Roger Bart as Mason Treadwell
 Tommy Flanagan as Malcolm Black
 Gina Torres as Natalie Waters
 Courtney Love as White Gold
 Tom Amandes as Lawrence Stamberg 
 Daniel Zovatto as Gideon LeMarchal

Guest cast
 Yeardley Smith as Phyllis
 Kim Richards as Stephanie
 Yancey Arias as Tom Kingsley
 Adrienne Barbeau as Marion Harper 
 Henry Czerny as Conrad Grayson
 Margarita Levieva as Amanda Clarke / Emily Thorne
 Hannah McCloud as young Louise Ellis-Ross
 Barry Sloane as Aiden Mathis
 Amber Valletta as Lydia Davis

Broadcast
The season aired simultaneously on Global in Canada. In the United Kingdom, it premiered on E4 on January 5, 2015. Season 4 premiered in Ireland on RTÉ2 on January 6, 2015 with a double bill before settling into its slot of 9:55pm two weeks later, and completed its run on May 19, 2015 from 10:05pm with a double bill.

Production
The fourth season began filming on July 11, 2014. Filming on the series finale ended on April 11, 2015.

Episodes

Ratings

References

2014 American television seasons
2015 American television seasons
Revenge (TV series)